The 1977–78 Philadelphia Flyers season was the Philadelphia Flyers' 11th season in the National Hockey League (NHL).

Regular season
The Flyers lost their hold on the Patrick Division in 1977–78 and settled for second place.

Tom Bladon's 8 points (4 goals and 4 assists) in a game against the Cleveland Barons on December 11 set an NHL record for a defenseman.

Season standings

Playoffs
After sweeping the Colorado Rockies in 2 games in the preliminary round, the Flyers moved on and beat Buffalo in five games. They faced Boston in the semifinals for the second consecutive season, and lost again, this time in five games.

Schedule and results

Regular season

|- style="background:#cfc;"
| 1 || October 13 || Chicago Black Hawks || 5–1 || 1–0–0 || 2 || 
|- style="background:#cfc;"
| 2 || October 15 || @ Pittsburgh Penguins || 8–2 || 2–0–0 || 4 || 
|- style="background:#cfc;"
| 3 || October 16 || St. Louis Blues || 7–0 || 3–0–0 || 6 || 
|- style="background:#cfc;"
| 4 || October 20 || Pittsburgh Penguins || 11–0 || 4–0–0 || 8 || 
|- style="background:#fcf;"
| 5 || October 22 || @ Toronto Maple Leafs || 1–6 || 4–1–0 || 8 || 
|- style="background:#fcf;"
| 6 || October 23 || Toronto Maple Leafs || 3–6 || 4–2–0 || 8 || 
|- style="background:#ffc;"
| 7 || October 26 || @ Chicago Black Hawks || 2–2 || 4–2–1 || 9 || 
|- style="background:#cfc;"
| 8 || October 29 || @ St. Louis Blues || 7–3 || 5–2–1 || 11 || 
|-

|- style="background:#cfc;"
| 9 || November 3 || Washington Capitals || 4–1 || 6–2–1 || 13 || 
|- style="background:#cfc;"
| 10 || November 5 || @ Washington Capitals || 3–1 || 7–2–1 || 15 || 
|- style="background:#cfc;"
| 11 || November 6 || Vancouver Canucks || 3–2 || 8–2–1 || 17 || 
|- style="background:#fcf;"
| 12 || November 10 || Buffalo Sabres || 2–3 || 8–3–1 || 17 || 
|- style="background:#ffc;"
| 13 || November 12 || @ New York Islanders || 2–2 || 8–3–2 || 18 || 
|- style="background:#cfc;"
| 14 || November 13 || Detroit Red Wings || 3–0 || 9–3–2 || 20 || 
|- style="background:#ffc;"
| 15 || November 17 || New York Islanders || 4–4 || 9–3–3 || 21 || 
|- style="background:#cfc;"
| 16 || November 19 || @ Minnesota North Stars || 7–2 || 10–3–3 || 23 || 
|- style="background:#cfc;"
| 17 || November 20 || Atlanta Flames || 4–0 || 11–3–3 || 25 || 
|- style="background:#fcf;"
| 18 || November 23 || @ Detroit Red Wings || 1–4 || 11–4–3 || 25 || 
|- style="background:#cfc;"
| 19 || November 25 || Cleveland Barons || 7–2 || 12–4–3 || 27 || 
|- style="background:#cfc;"
| 20 || November 27 || Los Angeles Kings || 2–0 || 13–4–3 || 29 || 
|- style="background:#cfc;"
| 21 || November 29 || @ Vancouver Canucks || 3–0 || 14–4–3 || 31 || 
|-

|- style="background:#cfc;"
| 22 || December 1 || @ Los Angeles Kings || 4–2 || 15–4–3 || 33 || 
|- style="background:#cfc;"
| 23 || December 3 || @ Colorado Rockies || 6–3 || 16–4–3 || 35 || 
|- style="background:#ffc;"
| 24 || December 7 || @ New York Rangers || 3–3 || 16–4–4 || 36 || 
|- style="background:#cfc;"
| 25 || December 8 || New York Rangers || 7–4 || 17–4–4 || 38 || 
|- style="background:#cfc;"
| 26 || December 10 || Chicago Black Hawks || 4–2 || 18–4–4 || 40 || 
|- style="background:#cfc;"
| 27 || December 11 || Cleveland Barons || 11–1 || 19–4–4 || 42 || 
|- style="background:#cfc;"
| 28 || December 15 || Boston Bruins || 6–4 || 20–4–4 || 44 || 
|- style="background:#cfc;"
| 29 || December 17 || @ Atlanta Flames || 4–3 || 21–4–4 || 46 || 
|- style="background:#fcf;"
| 30 || December 18 || Montreal Canadiens || 0–2 || 21–5–4 || 46 || 
|- style="background:#cfc;"
| 31 || December 21 || @ Cleveland Barons || 4–0 || 22–5–4 || 48 || 
|- style="background:#fcf;"
| 32 || December 23 || @ Boston Bruins || 1–6 || 22–6–4 || 48 || 
|- style="background:#cfc;"
| 33 || December 28 || @ New York Rangers || 4–3 || 23–6–4 || 50 || 
|- style="background:#cfc;"
| 34 || December 29 || Minnesota North Stars || 5–2 || 24–6–4 || 52 || 
|- style="background:#fcf;"
| 35 || December 31 || @ St. Louis Blues || 2–3 || 24–7–4 || 52 || 
|-

|- style="background:#cfc;"
| 36 || January 3 || Cleveland Barons || 5–4 || 25–7–4 || 54 || 
|- style="background:#ffc;"
| 37 || January 5 || Los Angeles Kings || 4–4 || 25–7–5 || 55 || 
|- style="background:#fcf;"
| 38 || January 6 || @ Atlanta Flames || 3–5 || 25–8–5 || 55 || 
|- style="background:#ffc;"
| 39 || January 9 || @ Montreal Canadiens || 3–3 || 25–8–6 || 56 || 
|- style="background:#fcf;"
| 40 || January 11 || @ Chicago Black Hawks || 4–5 || 25–9–6 || 56 || 
|- style="background:#ffc;"
| 41 || January 12 || Pittsburgh Penguins || 4–4 || 25–9–7 || 57 || 
|- style="background:#cfc;"
| 42 || January 14 || New York Rangers || 4–1 || 26–9–7 || 59 || 
|- style="background:#cfc;"
| 43 || January 16 || Atlanta Flames || 5–3 || 27–9–7 || 61 || 
|- style="background:#ffc;"
| 44 || January 19 || Montreal Canadiens || 1–1 || 27–9–8 || 62 || 
|- style="background:#fcf;"
| 45 || January 21 || @ New York Islanders || 1–6 || 27–10–8 || 62 || 
|- style="background:#cfc;"
| 46 || January 26 || @ Vancouver Canucks || 6–2 || 28–10–8 || 64 || 
|- style="background:#fcf;"
| 47 || January 28 || @ Colorado Rockies || 4–6 || 28–11–8 || 64 || 
|- style="background:#ffc;"
| 48 || January 29 || @ Detroit Red Wings || 3–3 || 28–11–9 || 65 || 
|-

|- style="background:#fcf;"
| 49 || February 1 || @ Chicago Black Hawks || 1–3 || 28–12–9 || 65 || 
|- style="background:#cfc;"
| 50 || February 2 || Colorado Rockies || 3–0 || 29–12–9 || 67 || 
|- style="background:#ffc;"
| 51 || February 4 || @ Cleveland Barons || 2–2 || 29–12–10 || 68 || 
|- style="background:#cfc;"
| 52 || February 6 || St. Louis Blues || 2–0 || 30–12–10 || 70 || 
|- style="background:#cfc;"
| 53 || February 9 || Vancouver Canucks || 5–2 || 31–12–10 || 72 || 
|- style="background:#cfc;"
| 54 || February 12 || Washington Capitals || 4–1 || 32–12–10 || 74 || 
|- style="background:#fcf;"
| 55 || February 16 || Minnesota North Stars || 2–4 || 32–13–10 || 74 || 
|- style="background:#cfc;"
| 56 || February 18 || Detroit Red Wings || 4–2 || 33–13–10 || 76 || 
|- style="background:#fcf;"
| 57 || February 19 || New York Islanders || 1–4 || 33–14–10 || 76 || 
|- style="background:#fcf;"
| 58 || February 23 || @ Buffalo Sabres || 0–4 || 33–15–10 || 76 || 
|- style="background:#cfc;"
| 59 || February 25 || @ Pittsburgh Penguins || 3–1 || 34–15–10 || 78 || 
|- style="background:#cfc;"
| 60 || February 26 || @ Washington Capitals || 6–1 || 35–15–10 || 80 || 
|- style="background:#ffc;"
| 61 || February 28 || @ Boston Bruins || 4–4 || 35–15–11 || 81 || 
|-

|- style="background:#fcf;"
| 62 || March 1 || @ Toronto Maple Leafs || 2–3 || 35–16–11 || 81 || 
|- style="background:#fcf;"
| 63 || March 4 || @ Montreal Canadiens || 1–7 || 35–17–11 || 81 || 
|- style="background:#cfc;"
| 64 || March 5 || St. Louis Blues || 7–1 || 36–17–11 || 83 || 
|- style="background:#cfc;"
| 65 || March 7 || Atlanta Flames || 5–3 || 37–17–11 || 85 || 
|- style="background:#cfc;"
| 66 || March 11 || Boston Bruins || 6–2 || 38–17–11 || 87 || 
|- style="background:#cfc;"
| 67 || March 12 || Colorado Rockies || 6–2 || 39–17–11 || 89 || 
|- style="background:#ffc;"
| 68 || March 15 || @ New York Rangers || 2–2 || 39–17–12 || 90 || 
|- style="background:#fcf;"
| 69 || March 16 || @ Buffalo Sabres || 1–3 || 39–18–12 || 90 || 
|- style="background:#ffc;"
| 70 || March 18 || Buffalo Sabres || 2–2 || 39–18–13 || 91 || 
|- style="background:#cfc;"
| 71 || March 20 || New York Islanders || 4–2 || 40–18–13 || 93 || 
|- style="background:#cfc;"
| 72 || March 23 || Toronto Maple Leafs || 4–1 || 41–18–13 || 95 || 
|- style="background:#cfc;"
| 73 || March 25 || @ Minnesota North Stars || 4–3 || 42–18–13 || 97 || 
|- style="background:#fcf;"
| 74 || March 28 || @ Colorado Rockies || 3–4 || 42–19–13 || 97 || 
|- style="background:#cfc;"
| 75 || March 31 || @ Vancouver Canucks || 3–2 || 43–19–13 || 99 || 
|-

|- style="background:#cfc;"
| 76 || April 1 || @ Los Angeles Kings || 4–2 || 44–19–13 || 101 || 
|- style="background:#ffc;"
| 77 || April 4 || @ New York Islanders || 3–3 || 44–19–14 || 102 || 
|- style="background:#cfc;"
| 78 || April 6 || New York Rangers || 3–0 || 45–19–14 || 104 || 
|- style="background:#ffc;"
| 79 || April 8 || @ Atlanta Flames || 1–1 || 45–19–15 || 105 || 
|- style="background:#fcf;"
| 80 || April 9 || Minnesota North Stars || 1–3 || 45–20–15 || 105 || 
|-

|-
| Legend:

Playoffs

|- style="background:#cfc;"
| 1 || April 11 || Colorado Rockies || 3–2 OT || Flyers lead 1–0 || 
|- style="background:#cfc;"
| 2 || April 13 || @ Colorado Rockies || 3–1 || Flyers win 2–0 || 
|-

|- style="background:#cfc;"
| 1 || April 17 || Buffalo Sabres || 2–4 || Sabres lead 1–0 || 
|- style="background:#cfc;"
| 2 || April 19 || Buffalo Sabres || 2–1 OT || Series tied 1–1 || 
|- style="background:#fcf;"
| 3 || April 22 || @ Buffalo Sabres || 5–2 || Flyers lead 2–1 || 
|- style="background:#cfc;"
| 4 || April 23 || @ Buffalo Sabres || 4–2 || Flyers lead 3–1 || 
|- style="background:#cfc;"
| 5 || April 25 || Buffalo Sabres || 6–3 || Flyers win 4–1 || 
|-

|- style="background:#fcf;"
| 1 || May 2 || @ Boston Bruins || 2–3 || Bruins lead 1–0 || 
|- style="background:#fcf;"
| 2 || May 4 || @ Boston Bruins || 5–7 || Bruins lead 2–0 || 
|- style="background:#cfc;"
| 3 || May 7 || Boston Bruins || 3–1 || Bruins lead 2–1 || 
|- style="background:#fcf;"
| 4 || May 9 || Boston Bruins || 2–4 || Bruins lead 3–1 || 
|- style="background:#fcf;"
| 5 || May 11 || @ Boston Bruins || 3–6 || Bruins win 4–1 || 
|-

|-
| Legend:

Player statistics

Scoring
 Position abbreviations: C = Center; D = Defense; G = Goaltender; LW = Left Wing; RW = Right Wing
  = Joined team via a transaction (e.g., trade, waivers, signing) during the season. Stats reflect time with the Flyers only.
  = Left team via a transaction (e.g., trade, waivers, release) during the season. Stats reflect time with the Flyers only.

Goaltending

Awards and records

Awards

Records

On December 11, 1977, defenseman Tom Bladon had a record-breaking game against the Cleveland Barons. He scored four goals, tying a team record, and picked up four assists for a total of eight points, a team record and tied for the NHL record among defenseman. His plus/minus of +10 in the game is an NHL single game record. Goaltender Bernie Parent won a team record ten consecutive games from November 20 to December 28. On April 1, Bill Barber tied a team record by scoring two shorthanded goals in a single game.

During the playoffs, Mel Bridgman scored the fastest playoff overtime goal in team history (23 seconds) to end game one of the team’s Preliminary Round series against the Colorado Rockies. The three goals they allowed to Colorado in two games is the least amount of goals the Flyers have allowed in any playoff series. On May 11, Orest Kindrachuk scored the two fastest goals by a single player in team playoff history, scoring eleven seconds apart.

Milestones

Transactions
The Flyers were involved in the following transactions from May 15, 1977, the day after the deciding game of the 1977 Stanley Cup Finals, through May 25, 1978, the day of the deciding game of the 1978 Stanley Cup Finals.

Trades

Players acquired

Players lost

Signings

Draft picks

Philadelphia's picks at the 1977 NHL amateur draft, which was held at the NHL's office in Montreal, Quebec, on June 14, 1977.

Farm teams
The Flyers were affiliated with the Maine Mariners of the AHL and the Philadelphia Firebirds of the NAHL.

Notes

References
General
 
 
 
Specific

Philadelphia Flyers seasons
Philadelphia
Philadelphia
Philad
Philad